The Altiplano (Spanish for "high plain") is an Andean highland in Bolivia, Peru, and Chile.

Altiplano may also refer to:

Places
 Altiplano Cundiboyacense, a Colombian Andean highland in Cundinamarca and Boyacá
 Altiplano Nariñense, a Colombian Andean highland in Nariño and Putumayo
 Mexican Altiplano, or Mexican Plateau, Mexico
 Federal Social Readaptation Center No. 1, "Altiplano", a maximum security federal prison in Mexico
 Altiplano de Granada, in Andalucia, Spain
 Altiplano de Yecla-Jumilla, a comarca of Region of Murcia, Spain
 The Altiplano, an elevated valley in Antarctica

Other uses
 Altiplano (2009 film), a drama film directed by Peter Brosens and Jessica Woodworth
 Altiplano (2018 film), an experimental short film directed by Malena Szlam
 Altiplanos, a 2005 album by Pierre Bensusan